Henry Archer (1799–1863) was a lawyer and railway enthusiast.

Henry Archer may also refer to:

Henry Archer (British Army officer), see List of British generals
Henry Archer (Fifth Monarchist) (died c. 1642)
Henry Archer (MP) (1700–1768), of Hale, Hampshire was a British Member of Parliament.
Henry Archer (rugby player) (born 1932)

See also
Harry Archer (disambiguation)
Henry Archer Ekers (1855–1937), Canadian industrialist and politician